James Turner (November 7, 1783 – March 28, 1861) was a United States Congressional representative from Maryland.

Turner was born near Bel Air, Maryland, and completed preparatory studies at the Classic Academy of Madonna, Maryland.  He was captain of militia in the War of 1812.  Afterwards, he moved to Parkton, Maryland, in 1811 and established a dairy farm.  He served as collector of State and county taxes in 1817, and served as a justice of the peace in 1824.  He was a member of the Maryland House of Delegates from 1824 to 1833, and was elected as a Jacksonian to the Twenty-third and Twenty-fourth Congresses, where he served from March 4, 1833, to March 3, 1837.  He was an unsuccessful candidate for reelection to Congress, but he again served in the House of Delegates in 1837 and 1838 and also as member of the Maryland Senate from 1855 to 1859.  He engaged in farming at Parkton until his death, and is interred in Bethel Cemetery near Madonna, Maryland.

References

1783 births
1861 deaths
Members of the Maryland House of Delegates
Maryland state senators
Jacksonian members of the United States House of Representatives from Maryland
People from Bel Air, Maryland
People from Harford County, Maryland
People from Parkton, Maryland
19th-century American politicians